The title Duke of Exeter was created several times in England in the later Middle Ages. Exeter is the main town of Devon. It was first created for John Holland, the half-brother of King Richard II in 1397. That title was rescinded upon Henry IV's accession to the throne two years later. The title was then granted to the former's half-brother, Thomas Beaufort, 1st Earl of Dorset by his nephew Henry V. Following Beaufort's death without heirs in 1426, the title was restored to the Holland family, which held it until the 3rd Duke was attainted in 1461 as a Lancastrian, dying in 1475.

Dukes of Exeter, first creation (1397)

John Holland, 1st Duke of Exeter (1352–1400), half-brother of Richard II, was executed for treason against his half-brother's cousin and rival Henry IV Bolingbroke, at which point his honours were forfeit.

Coat of arms
Arms: The arms of England (gules, three lions passant or), within a border azure, charged with fleur-de-lis of the second.
Crest: The royal lion on a chapeau, gorged with a collar azure, charged with fleurs-de-lis, and ducally crowned.

Dukes of Exeter, second creation (1416)

Thomas Beaufort, Duke of Exeter (c. 1377–1426), third legitimated son of John of Gaunt, Duke of Lancaster (himself the third son of Edward III), died without issue.

Coat of arms
Arms: The arms of England (quarterly: first and fourth, azure, three fleurs-de-lis; second and third, gules, three lions passant or), within a border gobony azure and ermine.
Crest: A portcullis or, nailed azure, chains of the first.

Dukes of Exeter, third creation (1444)
Sometimes numbered 2nd and 3rd dukes in reference to the 1397 creation
 John Holland, 2nd Duke of Exeter, 1st in this creation (1395–1447), son of the 1st Duke of the 1397 creation, was restored to his father's honours after service to his cousin, the Lancastrian king, Henry V
 Henry Holland, 3rd Duke of Exeter, 2nd in this creation (1430–1475), son of preceding, titles forfeited 1461

Coat of arms
As the first creation above.

See also
Marquess of Exeter

References 

Extinct dukedoms in the Peerage of England
Forfeited dukedoms in the Peerage of England
Noble titles created in 1397
Noble titles created in 1416
Noble titles created in 1444